Sharon Tiller is an American film maker who has numerous film and television credits as a writer, director, and producer. She is the WGBH-TV executive-in-charge for the American documentary television series Frontline, which she first joined in 1995 as a senior producer for special projects. She is married to journalist and news producer Lowell Bergman.

Awards and nominations
1991: George Polk Awards for National Television
2008: News & Documentary Emmy Award – New Approaches to News and Documentary Programming: Arts, Lifestyle and Culture for the Frontline/World episode "Moscow's Sex and the City" (nominated)

References

External links
 

American documentary filmmakers
George Polk Award recipients
Living people
Year of birth missing (living people)